Lena Sings Your Requests is a 1963 studio album by Lena Horne, arranged by Bob Florence and Marty Paich. After a long and successful partnership with RCA Victor, where Horne was signed between 1955-1962, Lena Horne signed at the lesser known Charter label releasing only two albums on the label both in 1963. This the first was recorded in Hollywood on January the 15th and 17th 1963 and released in the spring of 1963 on the Charter label. For this album Horne returned to re-record many songs that she had previously recorded in the 1940s and 1950s, several of which she had performed on screen, such as "Honeysuckle Rose" and "Can't Help Lovin' That Man". The album also features the fourth studio recording of the song "Stormy Weather" by Lena Horne. The album was reissued on CD in 2008 by Fresh Sound Records together with the album Lena Like Latin.

Track listing
 "Love" (Ralph Blane, Hugh Martin) – 2:47
 "I Wish I Was Back In My Baby's Arms" (K. Goell, Duke Ellington) - 2:29
 "Why Was I Born?" (Oscar Hammerstein, Jerome Kern) - 2:19
 "Good For Nothin' Joe" (Ted Koehler, Rube Bloom) - 3:34
 "Love Me Or Leave Me" (Gus Kahn, Walter Donaldson) - 2:53
 "I Got It Bad (And That Ain't Good)" (Paul Francis Webster, Duke Ellington) - 3:43
 "Stormy Weather" (Ted Koehler, Harold Arlen) - 3.17
 "Poppa Don't Preach To Me" (Frank Loesser) - 2:20
 "Honeysuckle Rose" (Andy Razaf, T. Waller) - 2:54
 "The Lady Is A Tramp" (Lorenz Hart, Richard Rodgers) - 2:17
 "Lover Man" (James Edward Davis, Roger 'Ram' Ramirez, Jimmy Sherman - 3:23
 "Can't Help Lovin' That Man" (Oscar Hammerstein, Jerome Kern) - 2:43

Personnel
Performance
Lena Horne – vocals
Jack Sheldon - trumpet
Bud Shank - alto sax
Gene DiNovi - piano
Shelly Manne - drums
Marty Paich – arranger, conductor, orchestration
Bob Florence - arranger

Production
Dick Peirce - producer
Jim Malloy - recording engineer

References

1963 albums
Lena Horne albums
Albums arranged by Marty Paich
Albums conducted by Marty Paich
Albums arranged by Bob Florence